is a Japanese professional footballer who plays as a midfielder for Tokushima Vortis.

Club statistics
Updated to 7 December 2019.

References

External links
 
 
 
 

1996 births
Living people
Japanese footballers
Association football midfielders
Oita Trinita players
J1 League players
Association football people from Kagoshima Prefecture